Inside Information may refer to:

Non-public information used in insider trading, of a corporation's stock or other securities (such as bonds or stock options)
Inside Information, expose of the Gestapo by Hansjürgen Koehler 1940
Inside Information, crime novel Nicholas Bentley 1978
Inside Information (1934 film), an American film directed by Robert F. Hill
Inside Information (1939 film), an American film directed by Charles Lamont
Inside Information (horse) (born 1991), a racehorse and winner of Breeders' Cup Distaff
Inside Information (album), a 1987 album by British-American rock band Foreigner, or the title track